On Broken Wings is an American metalcore band from Hull, Massachusetts, that formed in 2001. Often credited with pioneering the sound, and coining the term, of "moshcore",  a term originally used by the band to describe their fusion of metal with elements of post-hardcore and hardcore breakdowns. AllMusic described their style as post-emo metalcore with elements of grindcore.

After the self-released Number One Beautiful EP, they caught the attention of Eulogy Recordings, where they released two albums over the next five years, 2003's Some of Us May Never See the World and 2005's It's All a Long Goodbye. In early 2007, On Broken Wings released an EP entitled Going Down, which contained the original Number One Beautiful EP as well as four new songs.

Band members 
Jonathon Blake – vocals (2001-present)
Mike McMillen – guitar(2001-present)
Burke Medeiros – guitar (2001) (2003-present)
Rob Diangelo- bass/guitar(touring 2008–2016) (2016-present)
Kevin Garvin – drums (2001–present)

Former members 
Eric D – vocals (live)
Sean LaForce – guitar, vocals (2001–2003)
Brendan Connors – guitar (live)
Eric Ellis – guitar (live)
Sean Murray – guitar (2008)(live)
John "Chuck" Lombardo – bass (2001–2004)
Jerome McBride – bass (2005–2015)
Johnny Earle – keyboards, samples (2001–2003)
Josh "Skull" Long – drums (2008)(live)
Stevie "Brutal" Murray – drums (live)

Discography

Studio albums 
Some of Us May Never See the World  (Eulogy Recordings, 2003)
It's All A Long Goodbye (Eulogy Recordings, 2005)
Going Down (Eulogy Recordings, 2007)
Disintegrator (Artery Recordings, 2016)

EPs 
 Number One Beautiful (Wonderdrug Recordings, 2001)
 Summer Solstice (self-released, 2012)

References

External links 
On Broken Wings Myspace

Heavy metal musical groups from Massachusetts
Metalcore musical groups from Massachusetts
Musical groups established in 2001
Musical groups disestablished in 2007
Musical groups reestablished in 2008
Eulogy Recordings artists